Baladiyah al-Naseem, officially the Al-Naseem Sub-Municipality is a baladiyah and one of the 14 sub-municipalities of Riyadh, Saudi Arabia. It includes 8 neighborhoods and is responsible for their development, planning and maintenance.

Neighborhoods and districts 

 Al-Rayyan
 Al-Rawabi
 Al-Salam
 Al-Manar
 Al-Naseem al-Gharbi
 Al-Naseem al-Sharqi
 Al-Rimayah
 Al-Nazim

References 

Naseem